Long COVID or long-haul COVID (also known as post-COVID-19 syndrome, post-COVID-19 condition, post-acute sequelae of COVID-19 (PASC), or chronic COVID syndrome (CCS)) is a condition characterized by long-term health problems persisting or appearing after the typical recovery period of COVID-19. Although studies into long COVID are under way,  there is no consensus on the definition of the term.

Long COVID may affect multiple organ systems, including disorders of the respiratory, cardiovascular, gastrointestinal and nervous systems, mental health, metabolism, musculoskeletal pain, and anemia.

The most commonly reported symptoms of long COVID are fatigue and memory problems. Many other symptoms have also been reported, including malaise, headaches, shortness of breath, anosmia (loss of smell), parosmia (distorted smell), ageusia (distortion or loss of taste), muscle weakness, low-grade fever, and cognitive dysfunction.

Estimates of the prevalence of long COVID vary based on definition, population studied, time period studied, and methodology, generally ranging between 5% and 50%. Health systems in some countries and jurisdictions have been mobilized to deal with this group of patients by creating specialized clinics and providing advice. As of 2022, there are no tests or biomarkers to diagnose long COVID and no therapies to treat it. Overall, it is considered by default to be a diagnosis of exclusion.

Terminology and definitions

Overview
Long COVID is a patient-created term which was reportedly first used in May 2020 as a hashtag on Twitter by Elisa Perego, an archaeologist at University College London.

Long COVID has no single, strict definition. It is normal and expected that people who experience severe symptoms or complications such as post-intensive care syndrome or secondary infections will take longer to recover than people who did not require hospitalization (called mild COVID-19) and had no such complications. It can be difficult to determine whether an individual's set of ongoing symptoms represents a normal, prolonged convalescence, or extended 'long COVID'. One rule of thumb is that long COVID represents symptoms that have been present for longer than two months, though there is no reason to believe that this choice of cutoff is specific to infection with the SARS-CoV-2 virus.

World Health Organization clinical case definition
The World Health Organization (WHO) established a clinical case definition in October 2021, published in the journal The Lancet Infectious Diseases:

British definition
The British National Institute for Health and Care Excellence (NICE) divides COVID-19 into three clinical case definitions:
acute COVID-19 for signs and symptoms during the first four weeks after infection with severe acute respiratory syndrome coronavirus 2 (SARS-CoV-2) is the first, and
long Covid for new or ongoing symptoms four weeks or more after the start of acute COVID-19, which is divided into the other two:
ongoing symptomatic COVID-19 for effects from four to twelve weeks after onset, and
post-COVID-19 syndrome for effects that persist 12 or more weeks after onset.

NICE describes the term long COVID, which it uses "in addition to the clinical case definitions", as "commonly used to describe signs and symptoms that continue or develop after acute COVID-19. It includes both ongoing symptomatic COVID-19 (from four to twelve weeks) and post-COVID-19 syndrome (12 weeks or more)".

NICE defines post-COVID-19 syndrome as "Signs and symptoms that develop during or after an infection consistent with COVID‑19, continue for more than 12 weeks and are not explained by an alternative diagnosis. It usually presents with clusters of symptoms, often overlapping, which can fluctuate and change over time and can affect any system in the body. Post‑COVID‑19 syndrome may be considered before 12 weeks while the possibility of an alternative underlying disease is also being assessed".

American definition
In February 2021, the U.S. National Institutes of Health (NIH) director Francis Collins indicated long COVID symptoms for individuals who "don't recover fully over a period of a few weeks" be collectively referred to as "Post-Acute Sequelae of SARS-CoV-2 Infection" (PASC). The NIH listed long COVID symptoms of fatigue, shortness of breath, brain fog, sleep disorders, intermittent fevers, gastrointestinal symptoms, anxiety, and depression. Symptoms can persist for months and can range from mild to incapacitating, with new symptoms arising well after the time of infection. The Centers for Disease Control and Prevention (CDC) term Post-Covid Conditions qualifies long covid as symptoms four or more weeks after first infection.

Symptoms

A multinational online survey with 3,762 adult participants with illness lasting more than 28 days found that recovery takes longer than 35 weeks for 91% of them. On average, participants experienced 56 symptoms (standard deviation ± 25.5) in nine organ systems. Symptoms varied over time, and the most common symptoms after six months were fatigue, post-exertional malaise and cognitive dysfunction.

Symptom relapse occurred in 86% of adult participants triggered by physical or mental effort or by stress. Three groups of symptoms were identified: initial symptoms that peak in the first two to three weeks and then subside; stable symptoms; and symptoms that increase markedly in the first two months and then stabilize.

Symptoms reported by adults with long COVID include:

Fatigue, including extreme fatigue (see also: CFS)
Long-lasting cough
Muscle weakness
Low-grade fever
Inability to concentrate (brain fog)
Memory lapses
Mental health problems, such as changes in mood or depression
Sleep difficulties
Headaches
Joint pain
Prickling pain (paresthesia) in hands and feet
Diarrhoea
Bouts of vomiting
Loss of, or changes in, sense of smell (anosmia or parosmia)
Loss of, or changes in, sense of taste (dysgeusia)
Sore throat and or difficulties swallowing
Circulation disorders, including new onsets of diabetes and hypertension
Heartburn (gastroesophageal reflux disease)
Skin rash
Shortness of breath
Chest pains
Palpitations
Kidney problems (including, acute kidney injury and chronic kidney disease)
Changes in oral health (teeth, saliva, gums)
Tinnitus
Hearing loss
Blood clotting (including deep vein thrombosis and pulmonary embolism)
Erectile dysfunction
 Substantial exercise intolerance more than 3 months after infection; postexertional malaise has been reported in long COVID-19 similar to CFS

One study of 35,000 patients with long-COVID symptoms found cases clustered into 4 major symptom patterns:

Subphenotype 1 (cardiac and renal), representing ~33.75% of patients was dominated by cardiac-related, kidney-related and circulation-related issues, including cardiac and circulatory conditions, renal failure, anemia and fluid and electrolyte disorders.

Subphenotype 2 (respiratory, sleep and anxiety) representing 32.75% patients was dominated by respiratory conditions, sleep disorders, anxiety and symptoms such as headache and chest pain.

Subphenotype 3 (musculoskeletal and nervous) consisted of 23.37% patients.  This patients mainly had musculoskeletal and nervous system sequelae, such as musculoskeletal pain, headaches and sleep-wake disorders.

Subphenotype 4 (digestive and respiratory) included 10.14% patients who mainly had digestive system and respiratory conditions, including abdominal pain, breathing abnormalities and throat or chest pain, anaemia and nausea or vomiting. 

A retrospective cohort study of 1,913,234 Maccabi Healthcare Services members found that COVID-19 infection was significantly associated with increased risk for anosmia and dysgeusia, cognitive impairment, dyspnoea, weakness, and palpitations, with significant but lower risk for streptococcal tonsillitis and dizziness, during both the early and late phase of the disease. The study, which was conducted between 1 March 2020 and 1 October 2021, analyzed long-term health outcomes among patients infected with wild-type SARS-CoV-2, the Alpha variant, and the Delta variant; the study suggested that most patients who present with sequelae recover within a year of diagnosis.

Epidemiology

Estimates of the prevalence of long COVID vary widely. The estimates depend on the definition of long COVID and the population studied. An April 2022 meta-analysis estimated that the pooled prevalence of post-COVID conditions was 43%, with estimates ranging between 9% and 81%. People who had been hospitalised with COVID saw a higher prevalence of 54%, while this number dropped to 34% for nonhospitalised people. Prevalence generally decreased with a longer follow-up time. In people age 0–18 years the prevalence of long COVID conditions – like mood symptoms, CFS and sleep disorders – appears to be at ~25% overall.

In a large population cohort study in Scotland, 42% of respondents said they had not fully recovered after 6 to 18 months after catching COVID, and 6% indicated they had not recovered at all. The risk of long COVID was associated with disease severity; people with asymptomatic infection did not have increased risk of long COVID symptoms compared to people who had never been infected. Those that had been hospitalised had 4.6 times higher odds of no recovery compared to nonhopitalised people.

In June 2022, a CDC study based on electronic health records showed that "one in five COVID-19 survivors aged 18–64 years and one in four survivors aged ≥65 years experienced at least one incident condition that might be attributable to previous COVID-19" or long COVID. An analysis of private healthcare claims showed that of 78,252 patients diagnosed with 'long COVID', 75.8% had not been hospitalized for COVID-19.

Children
Long COVID is uncommon in children and their features differ from adults: In a retrospective cohort study from October 2022 of almost 660,000 US children tested for SARS-CoV-2 by antigen or polymerase chain reaction, the incidence of at least 1 systemic, syndromic, or medication feature of long COVID (1-6 months afterwards) was 42% among viral test–positive children versus 38% among viral test–negative children, that is there was an incidence proportion difference of only 3.7%. Long COVID was identified more in those cared for intensive care unit during the acute illness phase, children younger than 5 years, and those with complex chronic conditions. Neurological symptoms, such as headache, vertigo, and paresthesiae were not significant findings in this study, as opposed to in adults.

A 2021 study from the UK Office for National Statistics with 20,000 participants, including children and adults, found that, in children who tested positive, at least one symptom persisted after five weeks in 9.8% of children aged two to eleven years and in 13% of children aged 12 to 16 years. 
A 2022 University College London study in the UK found that children ages 11–17 who had a positive PCR test were more likely to have three or more symptoms three months after their diagnosis compared to those with a negative test.

Causes
It is currently unknown why most people recover fully within two to three weeks and others experience symptoms for weeks or months longer. The exact processes that cause long COVID remain uncertain, but research has established that long COVID is associated with changes in fatty acid metabolism and mitochondrial dysfunction.

A March 2021 review article cited the following pathophysiological processes as the predominant causes of long COVID:
direct toxicity in virus-infected tissue, especially the lungs
ongoing inflammation due to post-infection immune system dysregulation
vascular injury and ischemia caused by virus-induced hypercoagulability (tendency to form internal clots) and thromboses (internal blood clots)
impaired regulation of the renin-angiotensin system related to the effect of SARS-CoV-2 on ACE2-containing tissue

In October 2020, a review by the United Kingdom's National Institute for Health and Care Research hypothesized that ongoing long COVID symptoms may be due to four syndromes:
permanent damage to the lungs and heart,
post-intensive care syndrome,
 Post-viral fatigue, sometimes regarded as the same as myalgic encephalomyelitis / chronic fatigue syndrome (ME/CFS)
continuing COVID-19 symptoms, and
damage to the blood which deprives the body of oxygen.

Other situations that might cause new and ongoing symptoms to include:
the virus being present for a longer time than usual, due to an ineffective immune response;
reinfection (e.g., with another strain of the virus);
damage caused by inflammation and a strong immune response to the infection;
post-traumatic stress or other mental sequelae, especially in people who had previously experienced anxiety, depression, insomnia, or other mental health difficulties;
inhibited oxygen exchange as a result of persistent circulating blood plasma microclots; and
development of various autoantibodies after infection.

Similarities to other syndromes
Long COVID is similar to post-Ebola syndrome and the post-infection syndromes seen in chikungunya and myalgic encephalomyelitis/chronic fatigue syndrome (ME/CFS), which is often triggered by infection and immune activation and was previously also known as "post-viral fatigue". The pathophysiology of long COVID may be similar to these other conditions. Some long COVID patients in Canada have been diagnosed with ME/CFS, a "debilitating, multi-system neurological disease that is believed to be triggered by an infectious illness in the majority of cases". There is need for more research into ME/CFS; Anthony Fauci, former chief medical adviser to the US government, said that COVID-19 is a "well-identified etiologic agent that should be very helpful now in getting us to be able to understand [ME/CFS]".

Risk factors
Several risk factors have been found for long COVID:
Gender – Women are more likely to develop long COVID than men. Some research suggests this is due primarily to hormonal differences, while other research points to other factors, including chromosomal genetics, sex-dependent differences in immune system behavior; non-biological factors may also be relevant.
Age, with older people more at risk
Obesity
Asthma
Depression or anxiety
Post-traumatic stress
The number of symptoms during acute COVID

Diagnosis
There are no standardized tests or biomarkers to determine if symptoms existing weeks to years after COVID-19 infection are defined within one condition called long covid. Post-COVID conditions are not one illness, but rather may involve numerous organ systems and disorders.

In preliminary research, a custom-designed, mass spectrometry assay on blood samples assessing 96 proteins in inflammatory responses showed signs of inflammation remaining up to 40-60 days after COVID infection.

Risk reduction
A 2022 study found that COVID-19 vaccination reduced long COVID risk by about 15%. As of 2022, there are no firm definitions about how long covid occurs, no precise biomarkers or imaging tests to confirm it, no knowledge of its mechanism, and no therapies for treating long covid.

Treatment and management
, there are no established pharmaceutical treatments for long COVID, although numerous clinical trials are in progress to establish the efficacy and safety of possible therapies.

Management of long COVID depends on symptoms, with current guidelines recommending multidisciplinary rehabilitation to improve symptoms and quality of life. Rest, planning and prioritising are advised for people with fatigue. People who suffer from post-exertional system exacarbation may benefit from activity management with pacing. People with allergic-type symptoms such as rashes on the skin may benefit from antihistamines. People should also be routinely screened for mental health conditions, such as post-traumatic stress, which has been associated with fatigue severity.

Health system responses

Australia
In October 2020, a guide published by the Royal Australian College of General Practitioners (RACGP) says that ongoing post-COVID-19 infection symptoms such as fatigue, shortness of breath and chest pain will require management by GPs, in addition to the more severe conditions already documented.

In December 2021, research by a health economics expert at Deakin University suggests that even without fully understanding the Omicron variant's effects yet, a further 10,000 to 133,000 long COVID cases are likely to emerge on top of the current approximately 9450 in New South Wales and 19,800 in Victoria, after border and other restrictions had been recently lifted. The RACGP released new guidelines for general practitioners to manage a large number of new long COVID patients.

South Africa
In October 2020, the DATCOV Hospital Surveillance Department of the National Institute for Communicable Diseases (NICD) looked into a partnership with the International Severe Acute Respiratory and emerging Infection Consortium (ISARIC) (an open-access research and data resource) in order to conduct clinical research into the impact PASC may have within the South African context. As of 30 January 2021, the project has yet to receive ethical approval for the commencement of data collection. Ethics approval was granted on 3 February 2021 and formal data collection began on 8 February 2021.

United Kingdom
In Britain, the National Health Service set up specialist clinics for the treatment of long COVID. The four Chief Medical Officers of the UK were warned of academic concern over long COVID on 21 September 2020 in a letter written by Trisha Greenhalgh published in The BMJ signed by academics including David Hunter, Martin McKee, Susan Michie, Melinda Mills, Christina Pagel, Stephen Reicher, Gabriel Scally, Devi Sridhar, Charles Tannock, Yee Whye Teh, and Harry Burns, former CMO for Scotland.

In October 2020, NHS England's head Simon Stevens announced the NHS had committed £10 million to be spent that year on setting up long COVID clinics to assess patients' physical, cognitive, and psychological conditions and to provide specialist treatment. Future clinical guidelines were announced, with further research on 10,000 patients planned and a designated task-force to be set up, along with an online rehabilitation service – "Your Covid Recovery". The clinics include a variety of medical professionals and therapists, with the aim of providing "joined-up care for physical and mental health". NHS Long COVID clinics have been found to positively impact quality of life and support the management of symptoms, although further research is required to improve these services.

The National Institute for Health Research has allocated funding for research into the mechanisms behind symptoms of long COVID.

In December 2020, University College London Hospitals (UCLH) opened a second long COVID clinic at the National Hospital for Neurology and Neurosurgery for patients with post-COVID neurological issues. The first clinic had opened in May, primarily focused on respiratory problems, but both clinics refer patients to other specialists where needed, including cardiologists, physiotherapists and psychiatrists. By March 2021 there were 69 long COVID clinics in the English NHS, mostly focussing on assessing patients, with more planned to open. There were fears that community rehabilitation services did not have capacity to manage large numbers of referrals.

On 18 December 2020, the National Institute for Health and Care Excellence (NICE), the Royal College of General Practitioners (RCGP) and the Scottish Intercollegiate Guidelines Network (SIGN) published a guide to the management of long COVID. The guideline was reviewed by representatives of the UK doctors #longcovid group, an online support group for COVID long-haulers, who said that it could be improved by introducing a more comprehensive description of the clinical features and physical nature of long COVID, among other changes.

In November 2021 complaints were reported from NHS staff that neither their employers nor their trades unions were supportive, though the British Medical Association was pushing for long COVID to be classed as an occupational disease.

In May 2022 demand for occupational therapy led rehabilitation services in Britain was reported to have increased by 82% over the previous six months as occupational therapists were supporting people whose needs have become more complex because of delays in treatment brought about by the pandemic. Half of occupational therapists surveyed were supporting people affected by lasting Covid symptoms.

United States
On 23 February 2021, the National Institutes of Health director, Francis Collins, announced a major initiative, backed by $1.15 billion in funding over 4 years, to identify the causes and ultimately the means of prevention and treatment of people who have long COVID.  The initiative took on the name the "Researching COVID to Enhance Recovery," or RECOVER. The initiative intends to fund studies at more than 200 research sites across the United States. Part of this initiative includes the creation of the COVID-19 Project, which will gather data on neurological symptoms. In February 2022, at least sixty-six hospitals and health systems had launched COVID recovery programs to aid patients who experience long term or lingering symptoms.

Societal impact and support communities 
As of 2022, several countries and medical organizations have produced guidelines on long COVID for clinicians and the public. People with long covid may need  care within several clinical disciplines for long-term monitoring or intervention of ongoing symptoms, and to implement social services, physical therapy, or mental health care. In some countries, such as the UK and Germany, specialized long COVID outpatient clinics have been established to assess individual cases for the extent of surveillance and treatment needed. Two reviews indicated that  primary physicians should provide the first assessment of people with long covid symptoms, leading to specialist referrals for more complex long covid symptoms. Long-term follow-up of people with long COVID involves outcome reports from the people themselves to assess the impact on their quality of life, especially for those who were not hospitalized and receiving regular clinical follow-up. Digital technologies, such as videoconferencing, are being implemented between primary care physicians and people with long covid as part of long-term monitoring. 

Some people experiencing long COVID have formed community care networks and support groups on social media websites. Internationally, there are several long COVID advocacy groups. Clinical advice on self-management and online healthcare programs are used to support people with long covid.

See also

Impact of the COVID-19 pandemic on neurological, psychological and other mental health outcomes – both acute and chronic neurological, psychiatric, olfactory, and mental health conditions
Multisystem inflammatory syndrome in children – pediatric comorbidity from COVID-19
Post viral cerebellar ataxia – clumsy movement appearing a few weeks after a viral infection
Post-Ebola virus syndrome – symptoms that persist after recovering from Ebola
Post-polio syndrome – delayed reaction appearing years after acute polio infection resolves

References

Further reading

General
Long-term effects of coronavirus (long COVID) at UK National Health Service
News from BBC News

Journal articles

External links

Living with Covid19. A review of what is known about long COVID by the NIHR
Long-COVID treatments: why the world is still waiting, Heidi Ledford, Nature News Feature, 9 August 2022

Coronavirus-associated diseases
COVID-19
Impact of the COVID-19 pandemic on other health issues